Odiidae is a family of amphipods, sometimes included in the family Ochlesidae. It includes the following genera:
Antarctodius Berge, Vader & Coleman, 1999
Cryptodius Moore, 1992
Imbrexodius Moore, 1992
Odius Liljeborg, 1865
Postodius Hirayama, 1983

References

Gammaridea
Crustacean families